"Rockin' the Suburbs" is a song by Ben Folds on the album of the same name.

Music and lyrics 

Folds said of the inspiration for the song:

"I used to do this big rant at the end of some gigs with Ben Folds Five. The band broke into this big heavy metal thing and I started as a joke to scream in a heavy metal falsetto. I found myself saying things like: Feel my pain, I am white, feel my pain. I was going to write this song about Korn. I don't know, it wasn't as funny when I directed it at somebody. So I thought I would write it not directed to anybody. I mean, I would be happy to tell the guys from Korn that I wrote a song about them, but I think, when people listen to it, it is a better song when it is not directed to anybody."

The song parodies Korn and Rage Against the Machine. Folds stated of the song "I am taking the piss out of the whole scene, especially the followers."

Single track listing
"Rockin' the Suburbs" [Radio Edit]
"Girl"
"Make Me Mommy"
"Rockin' the Suburbs" [Video]
Japanese EP:
"Rockin' the Suburbs" [Radio Edit]
"One Down"
"Girl"
"Make Me Mommy"
"The Secret Life of Morgan Davis"

Music video
The music video for "Rockin' the Suburbs" was directed by friend "Weird Al" Yankovic, who also plays the role of a producer who fixes Folds' "shitty track," directly riffing on one of the song's lyrics. The video features Folds playing multiple members of an angry rock band in a suburban den and in front of a white background.

After the song's bridge, Folds is shown outside in a suburban neighborhood wearing a backwards red New York Yankees cap, the trademark of Limp Bizkit's Fred Durst, while singing the lyrics, "girl give me something I can break", which were a riff on the Limp Bizkit song "Break Stuff". During this portion of the video, Folds engages in "suburban" activities such as skateboarding, jumping in pools and flipping burgers.

At the end of the video, the "band" (all played by Folds again) plays in front of a black background with holes punched in it, a style that deliberately matches the live-action parts of the Korn video for "Freak on a Leash." A subliminal message reading "Korn Sucks" briefly appears.

Over the Hedge remake 

In 2006, Folds rewrote the song for the animated movie Over the Hedge, with film co-star William Shatner providing vocals during part of the song. Shatner does the voice for Ozzie the Opossum, who encourages his teenage daughter Heather (voice by Avril Lavigne) to play dead in threatening situations.

While this version features entirely new lyrics intended to be more family-friendly than the original, Folds maintains the song’s satirical edge. The rewritten lyrics focus more on the institution of suburbia, and include jabs at homeowner associations, tract housing, consumerism, and developments built on Native American burial grounds.

This version of the song was also featured in the film Marley & Me during the montage of Marley growing up in a year from a small puppy to a big dog for the rest of the movie.

References

External links
 "Rockin' the Suburbs video on official sonyBMG site

2001 songs
2001 singles
Ben Folds songs
Songs written by Ben Folds
Music videos directed by "Weird Al" Yankovic
Epic Records singles
Satirical songs
Songs about rock music
Songs about musicians
Works about suburbs